Celenza is a surname. Notable people with the surname include:

Christopher Celenza (born 1967), American scholar of Renaissance history
Frankie Celenza (born 1986), American cook and television personality